The 2015 Trofeo Città di Brescia was a professional tennis tournament played on carpet courts. It was the second edition of the tournament which was part of the 2015 ATP Challenger Tour. It took place in Brescia, Italy between November 16 and November 21, 2015.

Singles main-draw entrants

Seeds

 1 Rankings are as of November 9, 2015.

Other entrants
The following players received wildcards into the singles main draw:
  Grégoire Barrère 
  Gianluca Mager
  Lorenzo Sonego

The following players received into the singles main draw entry as special exempts:
  Laslo Đere
  Egor Gerasimov

The following players received entry from the qualifying draw:
  Marco Chiudinelli
  Kevin Krawietz 
  Roberto Marcora
  Matteo Viola

The following players received entry as a lucky losers:
  Elias Ymer
  Francesco Borgo
  Dimitar Kuzmanov
  Andrea Pellegrino

Champions

Singles

 Igor Sijsling def.  Mirza Bašić 6–4, 6–4

Doubles

 Ilija Bozoljac /  Igor Zelenay def.  Mirza Bašić /  Nikola Mektić   6–0, 6–3

External links
Official Website 

Trofeo Citta di Brescia
Trofeo Città di Brescia
2015 in Italian sport